The Siberian weasel or kolonok (Mustela sibirica), is a medium-sized weasel native to Asia, where it is widely distributed and inhabits various forest habitats and open areas. It is therefore listed as Least Concern on the IUCN Red List.

Description

The Siberian weasel has a long, stretched out body with relatively short legs. Its head is elongated, narrow and relatively small, and its short ears are broad at the base. Its tail is half the length of its body. Its winter fur is very dense, soft and fluffy, with guard hairs reaching 3–4 cm in length. The underfur is dense and loose fitting. Siberian weasels are monotone in colour, being bright reddish-ocherous or straw-red, though orange or peach tones are sometimes noticeable on the skin. These tones are especially bright on the back, while the flanks and underbelly are paler. A dark, coffee-brown mask is present on the face. Their tails are more brightly coloured than the back, and are fluffier than those of other members of the genus. The lips and chin are white or slightly ochreous. The front of the muzzle is darker than the remaining parts of the head. Its skull is in several respects intermediate in form between that of the stoat and the mink; it is longer and larger than that of the stoat, but is somewhat more flattened than the mink's. The tail in males reaches  in length, while that of females reaches . Males weigh , while females weigh . Exceptionally large individuals were sighted in the Baraba steppe.

Behaviour and ecology

Burrows
The Siberian weasel builds its nest inside fallen logs, empty stumps, brushwood piles and exposed tree roots. It also uses and enlarges the dens of other species. Adults have a permanent burrow and up to five temporary shelters, which may be separated from each other by several kilometres. They build a nesting chamber in the middle or end of the burrow and line it with bird feathers and rodent hair.

Diet
In terms of prey selection, Siberian weasels are midway between small, rodent-eating mustelids such as polecats and the more polyphagous martens. They rarely eat reptiles, invertebrates and plants, preferring instead to prey on rodents of small to moderate size. Water voles are their most frequent prey in their western range, while voles and mice are eaten in their eastern range. Moderate sized rodents targeted by Siberian weasels in the east include Daurian and Alpine pikas, and Siberian zokors. In local areas, chipmunks, muskrats, red squirrels and jerboas are eaten. Fish may be eaten in some areas during certain seasons. In Ussuriland, they scavenge extensively on the kills of wolves and yellow-throated martens during the winter. Elsewhere, small birds are an important food item. Reptiles and amphibians are typically eaten at the periphery of the Siberian weasel's range. Plant foods known to be eaten by Siberian weasels include pine nuts and Actinidia fruits. They typically eat about 100–120 gm of food daily, and cache excess food. In urban areas in China, Siberian weasels prey extensively on rats. They are capable of killing and dragging the largest fowls. Siberian weasels are active hunters and chase prey through snow, logs, water and people's houses.

Reproduction

The rutting period of the Siberian weasel varies depending on location. In western Siberia, it begins in early February to late March. In Primorye, it begins in early March to late April. Six pairs of Siberian weasels in a fur sovkhoz near Moscow were in rut between 25 April and 15 May. They repeatedly mate during 35 minutes.  The gestation period lasts 38–41 days. There is one record of a female giving birth after only 28 days. Litters consist of 4–10 kits. They are born blind and are sparsely furred with white hair. They develop light yellow hair after a few days, and open their eyes after a month. They suckle for two months, and become independent by late August. By this time, the young have almost reached adult size, but still have their deciduous teeth and lighter bones. Their fur is darker than that of adults.

Subspecies
, 11 subspecies are recognised.

Distribution and habitat
The Siberian weasels ranges from the Himalayas in Pakistan, India, Nepal and Bhutan to northern Myanmar, northern Thailand, Laos, Taiwan, China, and North Korea. In Russia, it occurs in the Kirov Province, Tataria, from the western Urals through Siberia to the Russian Far East. It has been introduced to Honshu, Shikoku and Kyushu islands.

Cultural significance

In Chinese folklore, the Siberian weasel is viewed as a wandering spirit (shen) that can steal and replace people's souls.

Although Siberian weasels are overall useful for limiting rodent populations, they are nonetheless damaging to poultry and muskrat farms. They frequently enter the roosts of domesticated fowl and pigeons, sometimes killing more than they can eat.

Siberian weasels are valuable furbearers, being significantly harvested in Siberia and the Far East. Their fur is used both in its natural state and for imitating the fur of more valuable species. A couple of alternative names for the fur were Tartar sable and fire marten. Siberian weasel fur is also used to make the so-called kolinsky sable-hair brush. In China, their orange fur is largely used to create ink brushes for calligraphers. The name of the brush is thus 狼毫筆, lit. 'wolf hairs brush', as a reduction from 黃鼠狼 + 毫 + 筆, lit. "yellow rat wolf" "hairs" "brush". Their hairs are appreciated because they are harder than goat hair (羊毫). They are hunted by shooting with dogs or through the use of box traps. They are extremely aggressive when caught in traps, emitting piercing shrieks and letting loose a pungent secretion which reportedly takes a month to wash away.

References

Notes

Bibliography

Weasels
Mammals of Asia
Mammals of Bhutan
Mammals of China
Mammals of Nepal
Mammals of Russia
Mammals of Taiwan
Fauna of Siberia
Mammals described in 1773